Charles Wells (4 May 1937 in Atlanta, Georgia – 17 June 2017) was an American mathematician known for his fundamental contributions to category theory. He was Professor Emeritus of Mathematics at Case Western Reserve University.

Wells taught there for about 35 years, with sabbatical interruptions at ETH Zürich (in mathematics) and Oxford University (in computing science). He had a research career in mathematics in finite fields, group theory and category theory. In the last twenty years of this life he had also been interested in the language of mathematics and related issues concerning teaching and communicating abstract ideas.

Publications
In addition to his scholarly publications, Wells produced A Handbook of Mathematical Discourse, which is a dictionary of words and concepts used by mathematicians that are easily misunderstood, explained in a way that laypersons can also appreciate.

As a life-long shape note singer, in 2002 Wells jointly compiled a tunebook called Oberlin Harmony, which included some of his own compositions.

Books
 
 Michael Barr and Charles Wells: Category Theory for Computing Science (1999).

Selected research articles

Surveys
 Sketches (1993) – a survey of the literature on sketches

References

External links
 
 Gyre & Gimble – blog on the language of math, category theory, and teaching abstract ideas
 Abstract Math – for university-level math students

Living people
20th-century American mathematicians
21st-century American mathematicians
1937 births
People from Atlanta
Mathematicians from Georgia (U.S. state)